Shevaun Mizrahi is a Turkish-American documentary filmmaker. She received a Jury Special Mention Award at the Locarno Film Festival 2017 for her documentary film Distant Constellation among many other awards including the Best Picture Prize at the Jeonju International Film Festival 2018 and the FIPRESCI Critics Prize at the Viennale (Vienna International Film Festival) 2018. Indiewire wrote, “Distant Constellation is one of the more exciting achievements in nonfiction cinema in recent memory." She was named one of Filmmaker Magazine's 25 New Faces of Film in 2015 and is the recipient of a 2018 Guggenheim Fellowship. In December 2018, she received the Best Cinematography Award from the International Documentary Association.

Biography 
Mizrahi grew up in Boston, Massachusetts. She received her undergraduate education in cognitive neuroscience and English literature from the University of Pennsylvania. She graduated in fine arts from the film school at the New York University.

Awards

Viennale (Vienna International Film Festival) - FIPRESCI PRIZE  

 Won: International Critics Prize Distant Constellation, 2017

Seville Film Festival 2017 

 Won: New Waves Non-fiction Award Distant Constellation, 2017

The 22nd annual Truer Than Fiction Award 

 Nominated: 22nd Jeep Truer Than Fiction Award Distant Constellation, 2018

Guggenheim Foundation 2018 Fellow  

 Won: Guggenheim Foundation 2018 Fellowship under CREATIVE ARTS (Film-video)

Best Picture Prize at Jeonju International Film Festival  

 Won: Best Picture Prize at Jeonju International Film Festival 2018

Locarno Festival 2017 Won 

 Won: Jury's Special Mention Award, 2017

Golden Apricot Yerevan International Film Festival 
 Won: Best Documentary Prize at the Golden Apricot Yerevan International Film Festival.

Some other awards that she won are:
 International Documentary Association Awards, Best Cinematography Award 
 International Documentary Association Awards, Best Editing Nominee 
 Cinema Eye Honors, Best Debut Film Nominee
 Cinema Eye Honors, Best Cinematography Nominee 
 London Film Festival, Best Documentary Nominee  
 Tacoma Film Festival, Best Documentary Award 
 DokuFest, Best Film Award 
 Message to Man, Best Debut Award  
 Message to Man, International Federation of Film Societies Prize
 Yerevan Golden Apricot Film Festival, Best Documentary Award

Filmography 
 Myanmar Hotel (2009)
 Distant Constellation (2017)

References 

American documentary filmmakers
Living people
Year of birth missing (living people)
American people of Turkish descent